The 2017–18 season was the 49th campaign of the Scottish Basketball Championship, the national basketball league of Scotland. 18 teams were split into Division 1, featuring 10 teams, and Division 2, featuring 8 teams. St Mirren won their 2nd league title.

Teams

The line-up for the 2017-18 season features the following teams:

Division 1

Boroughmuir Blaze
City of Edinburgh Kings
Dunfermline Reign
Edinburgh University 
Sony Centre Fury
Glasgow Storm
Glasgow University
Pleasance 
Stirling Knights
St Mirren West College Scotland

Division 2
Ayrshire Tornadoes 
Boroughmuir Blaze B
City of Edinburgh Kings B
Edinburgh Lions
Glasgow University B
Heriot Watt University
Perth Phoenix
West Lothian Wolves

Format
In Division 1, each team plays each other twice, once home, once away, for a total of 18 games.

In Division 2, each team plays each other twice, once home, once away, for a total of 14 games.

Division 1

League table

Edinburgh University received a 1 point deduction for conceding their match against Glasgow University.

Playoffs
Quarter-finals

Semi-finals

Final

Division 2

League table

Playoffs
Semi-finals

Final

Scottish Cup
Scottish Cup (basketball)

1st Round

2nd Round

Quarter-finals

Semi-finals

Final

References

Scottish Basketball Championship Men seasons
Scotland
Scotland
basketball
basketball